Juan Mostert (born 11 January 2000) is a South African rugby union player for the  in the United Rugby Championship and  in the Currie Cup. His regular position is fly-half.

Mostert was named in the  side for the 2022 Currie Cup Premier Division. Previously, Mostert had agreed to sign for Major League Rugby side , but decided against the move to join the Bulls instead.

References

South African rugby union players
Living people
Rugby union fly-halves
Blue Bulls players
2000 births
Bulls (rugby union) players